Line 1 of the Navi Mumbai Metro is part of the rapid transit rail system for the city of Navi Mumbai, India. The 23.40 km line consists of 20 metro stations from Belapur to Khandeshwar. It is expected to cost . On 7 May 2021, State-run town planning authority CIDCO conducted a successful trial run on the approach route to and the test track at Taloja metro depot, and claimed that it was "successful in all respects". The metro was supposed to be operational by 2016, but it yet to be opened till today.

History
The following dates represent the dates the section opened to the public, not the private inauguration.

Background
The feasibility study for the Navi Mumbai Metro was carried out by the Delhi Metro Rail Corporation (DMRC). CIDCO was authorised as the implementing agency of the Belapur-Pendhar-Kalamboli-Khandeshwar line, under the Indian Tramway Act 1886, by the Government of Maharashtra on 30 September 2010. The state government later asked the CIDCO to implement the Navi Mumbai Metro project under the Central Metro Act. The detailed master plan for Line 1 was prepared by the DMRC. The proposed route will link Belapur, Kharghar, Taloje, MIDC, Kalamboli and the Khandeshwar railway station, terminating at the proposed Navi Mumbai International Airport.

Construction
The metro's foundation stone was laid on 1 May 2011 by Chief Minister Prithviraj Chavan, and general foundation work on the system's first phase commenced in October 2011. Line 1's first girder was placed on 13 December 2012.

Line 1 is planned to be developed in 3 phases.

CIDCO awarded the contract for civil works in Phase I to six firms. Spanish contractor San José Constructora will design and build five stations, located at Central Park, Pethpada, Sector 34, Panchanand and Pendhar. In the second phase, an  line will be built from Khandeshwar to Taloje MIDC, with seven stations. The third phase will entail the merging of two rail corridors between Pendhar and MIDC with a  link, forming a loop from Belapur to Khandeshwar. A maintenance depot will be constructed on a  plot at Taloja for the circular line, and a temporary maintenance depot will be constructed on five hectares of land at Khandeshwar.

Line 1 was expected to be completed by 2016 but its most likely to miss deadline, trains may roll out only by July 2017. CIDCO has plans to extend Line 1 up to Kalyan – Ulhasnagar -Murbad.

Funding
Phase I of Line 1 was executed using CIDCO funds. The total cost of Line 1 is estimated to be .

Stations

Stage 1

Stage 2

Stage 3
Stage 3 involves the construction of a 2 km link and one station between Pendhar and MIDC, to join Stage 1 and Stage 2, and also the construction of a 5 km link to connect the upcoming Navi Mumbai International Airport from Khandeshwar, from where the Navi Mumbai International Airport Metro Station will be connected with the proposed Line 8 (Gold Line) of Mumbai Metro till Chhatrapati Shivaji Maharaj International Airport.

Infrastructure
An international consortium of companies including Ansaldo STS, Tata Projects and CSR Zhuzhou will provide the electrical and mechanical systems for the first phase of Line 1. Ansaldo will conduct systems integration and supply train control systems, telecoms, fare collection systems and equipment storage. The metro's standard gauge network would be electrified at 25 kV AC, with power provided via an overhead catenary.

Rolling stock
In 2014, the Chinese company CSR Zhuzhou signed a contract with CIDCO to supply rolling stock for the first phase of the metro's Line 1. The trains would feature stainless steel bodies, air-conditioning and LED lighting.

References

Rapid transit lines in India
Transport in Navi Mumbai
Navi Mumbai Metro lines